"Thelo" (Greek: Θέλω) is a song by Greek singer Despina Vandi. On October 10, 2007 (10/10), Despina released the song simultaneously on all radio stations and TV stations across Greece at 10 AM. It marked her 10th anniversary of collaborating with the composer Phoebus. The song topped Nielsen's Radio Airplay chart for 8 consecutive weeks in Greece. It is the first single released from the album 10 Hronia Mazi.

Music video
The music video was directed by Kostas Kapetanidis by special permission from Kalivourgiki. It took 48 hours to complete and throughout the duration the cast were provided with gas masks to protect themselves from the fumes and smoke from the pyrotechnics used. The video features Vandi as the frontwoman of a rock group, with Phoebus playing piano. In continuation the setting begins to catch fire including the piano and area where the band is performing.

Critical reception
Phoebus accused that this song samples the song Clocks by Coldplay. Also TV presenter Guy Krief from TV show "Ninja TV" on MAD TV presented a mixed video, which has been sent by a viewer about the song "Thelo" by Despina Vandi and "Clocks" by Coldplay. Although, the song grown high popularity.

Promo single track listing
"Thelo"
"Thelo" (DJ Luke Remix)
"Thelo" (Video Version)

References

2007 singles
Despina Vandi songs
Greek-language songs
Music videos directed by Kostas Kapetanidis
Songs written by Phoebus (songwriter)
2007 songs
Heaven Music singles